Yeni Suraxanı (also, Imeni Kirova, Kirov Adına, Kirova, Posëlok Imeni Kirova, Rəsulzadə, and Yeni-Surakhany) is a municipality in Baku, Azerbaijan.  It has a population of 16,127.

References 

Populated places in Baku